Pornography in Brazil with explicit sex scenes began in the modern era after the lifting of the censorship of the military regime in Brazil. During the period of censorship, there was an erotic genre  without  explicit sex scenes, called pornochanchada.

In 1992, about eight million copies of pornographic magazines were believed to be sold in Brazil, while one in four Brazilians of both sexes had watched an explicit sex movie. In a 1994 survey, this number increased slightly for women and doubled for men.

Current

There are Brazilian companies, such as Brasileirinhas, produce porn movies in Brazil. Brasileirinhas is the largest film producer in Brazil and features actresses such as Julia Paes and Monica Mattos, among others.

In November 2013, Brasileirinhas stopped releasing DVDs and started selling it over the internet. Other brands such as Explicita Videos, Sexxxy, Buttman and Planet Sex have stopped producing.

References

Pornochanchada
Brazil